The Accademia degli Arcadi or Accademia dell'Arcadia, "Academy of Arcadia" or "Academy of the Arcadians", was an Italian literary academy founded in Rome in 1690. The full Italian official name was Pontificia Accademia degli Arcadi.

History

Foundation 
The beginnings of the Accademia degli Arcadi date to February 1656, when a literary circle formed under the patronage of Queen Christina of Sweden, who had abdicated the Swedish crown in 1654, converted to Catholicism, and taken up her residence in Rome, where she spent much of the rest of her life. There she became a significant patron of music and opera, with composers including Alessandro Scarlatti, Alessandro Stradella and Arcangelo Corelli dedicating works to her. After her death in 1689, the academy was established in her memory and elected her as its symbolic head (basilissa, the Greek term for 'Queen'). The Academy lasted for the next two hundred years, remaining a leading cultural institution into the 20th century.

The Accademia degli Arcadi was so-called because its principal intention was to reform the diction of Italian poetry, which the founders believed had become corrupt through over-indulgence in the ornamentation of the baroque style, under the inspiration of pastoral literature, the conventions of which imagined the life of shepherds, originally supposed to have lived in Arcadia in the golden age, divinely inspired in poetry by the Muses, Apollo, Hermes and Pan. The Academy chose as its emblem the pipe of Pan with its seven unequal reeds.

The fourteen founders selected as the first Custode di Arcadia or president of the academy, Giovanni Mario Crescimbeni who was the author of a history of Italian poetry and of various literary works. The Arcadians resolved to return to the fields of truth, always singing of subjects of pastoral simplicity and drawing their inspiration from Greco-Roman bucolic poetry. The ideal parameters for the artistic work were simplicity and a sense of measure and beauty. Common to all the poets was the desire to oppose the poetry of the Marinists, and return to classic poetry, embracing also the recent rationalist influence of Descartes. Norms and rituals of the academy took their cue from classic and pastoral mythology, as in the custom of assuming 'pastoral' names (Crescimbeni, for example, chose that of 'Alfesibeo Cario'). The fourteen founder members included the librettist Silvio Stampiglia and the poet Vincenzo Leonio.

The first solemn gathering of the Arcadians was held on the Janiculum hill, in a wood belonging to the Reformed Minorites, on 5 October 1690.

Orsini Gardens & Beyond 
In 1692, the meetings were transferred to the gardens of Duke Orsini on the Esquiline hill; in 1696, to the Farnese Gardens on the Palatine. Finally, the generosity of John V of Portugal, one of its members under the name of Arete Melleo, enabled the society to secure (1723) on the Janiculum a site known as the Bosco Parrasio or (Parrasian Grove). Here they held their meetings on summer days, in winter moving to the Teatro degli Arcadi in the Palazzo Salviati. In 1696 the Accademia admitted seven musicians including Giovanni Bononcini.

While the academy was still on the Palatine, its Statuto or Constitution was drawn up. This constitution (the work of co-founder Gian Vincenzo Gravina) was modelled on the ancient Roman laws of the 'Twelve Tables', and was engraved on marble. Differing tendencies soon asserted themselves, following the ideas of the two founders: that of Gravina stood in the tradition of Homer and Dante, while that of Crescimbeni was more influenced by Petrarch. Because of these differences, Gravina left to found the Accademia dei Quirini in 1711. Despite this loss, Arcadia retained its vigour in the following years, and created colonies in many cities of Italy. Many noblemen, ecclesiastics, and artists held membership in it to be an honour, and very soon it numbered 1,300. Much of what they produced, however, was either mediocre or pretentious (an example is Saverio Bettinelli's disparagement of Dante), although the Academy did receive some endorsement for its attack on the redundant Rococo style, then dominant in art and literature.

The celebrated opera librettist Pietro Metastasio (1698–1782) although he had his own differences with Arcadia, was a student of Gravina's, and a leading light of the academy's second generation. His works, of which the best remembered might be Il Re Pastore because of its setting by Mozart, may represent the closest thing to a justification of the program that Arcadia achieved.

In 1795, the academy admitted the Italian Diodata Saluzzo Roero, as one of its first female members, but some evidence does exist for earlier female members. In the 17th century, the poet Maria Antonia Scalera Stellini was elected a member, and the 1721 edition of the Academy's publication included work by Caterina Imperiale Lercari Pallavicini.

Anti-Arcadian Reaction 
A violent anti-Arcadian reaction soon developed, and, starting from the early 19th century, Arcadianism began to be regarded as a late and unconvincing expression of the ancien régime. After the end of the French Revolution, the Academy strove to renew itself in accord with the spirit of the times, without sacrificing its traditional system of sylvan associations and pastoral names. The Academy no longer represented a literary school, but a general interest in the classics and figures like Dante came to be greatly honoured by its members. Furthermore, the Academy's field of endeavour was enlarged to include many branches of study, including history and archaeology. The new Arcadian revival was marked by the foundation (1819) of the Giornale Arcadico. In 1925 the Academy was renamed to become the Arcadia – Accademia Letteraria Italiana, a historical institute.

Legacy 
The Accademia degli Arcadi counted among its members some of the principal literary men and women of the time, including Carlo Alessandro Guidi, Petronilla Paolini Massimi, Benedetto Menzini, librettist Pietro Metastasio, Francesco Redi Paolo Rolli, and linguist Clotilde Tambroni, among others. The famous composer George Frideric Handel is known to have often attended the meetings and symposia of the Arcadians when studying in Italy, under the patronage of Ruspoli, a leading member of the Academy. There is an interesting account of the Academy's history and program in Goethe's 'Italian Journey'.

The archives of the academy are currently housed in the Biblioteca Angelica, next to the church of Sant'Agostino in Rome. The paintings are housed in the Palazzo Braschi.

Atti e memorie dell'Accademia letteraria italiana was published by the academy.

Notes

References
 Barroero, L. and Susinno, S. 'Arcadian Rome, Universal Capital of the Arts', in Art in Rome in the Eighteenth Century, ed. E. P. Bowron and J. J. Rishel, 47–77 (Philadelphia: Philadelphia Museum of Art, 2000)
 Dixon, S. M. (1999) "Women in Arcadia", Eighteenth Century Studies, 32(3), pp. 371–375.
 Dixon, S. M. (2006) Between the real and the ideal: the Accademia degli Arcadi and its garden in eighteenth-century Rome (Newark, Del.: University of Delaware Press).
 Forment, B. (2008) Moonlight on Endymion: In Search of “Arcadian Opera,” 1688-1721, Journal of Seventeenth-Century Music, 14(1). Online: https://sscm-jscm.org/v14/no1/forment.html 
 Giorgetti Vichi, A. M. (ed.) (1977) Gli Arcadi dal 1690 al 1800: Onomasticon (Rome, Arcadia – Accademia Letteraria Italiana). (List of members.)
 Claudio Rendina, Enciclopedia di Roma, Rome: Newton Compton, 2000.

External links
Official website
Notes on the Accademia dell'Arcadia from the Scholarly Societies project

Education in Rome
Italian literature
1690 establishments in Italy
Italian writers' organisations
17th century in Rome